Andrew Rennie is a former association football player who represented New Zealand at international level.

Rennie scored on his full All Whites debut, a 1–3 loss to Chile on 18 June 1995 and ended his international playing career with 13 A-international caps and 1 goals to his credit, his final cap an appearance in a 0–3 loss to Norway on 22 January 1997.

References 

Year of birth missing (living people)
Living people
New Zealand association footballers
New Zealand international footballers
Association footballers not categorized by position
1996 OFC Nations Cup players